U-special is a half-hour television talk show that first aired on Indian television in 2007 in New Delhi. It was created by New Delhi Television. The show went on to become one of the channel's highest rated feature programmes. It is named after the Delhi transport corporations (DTC) bus service University-Special, which is a student transport facility in New Delhi.

U-special gives young India a platform to comment on issues of contemporary socio-political relevance and is a unique show format that centres on India's urban youth and their lives on campus. Its target audience ranges between the age group of 18-25 in India's capital city - New Delhi. The show fluctuates between a fixed discussion format that is shot at a particular Delhi college/university with a "show topic" and a more mobile structure where the narrative is split into fragments and shot at various colleges while strung together by a common line of questions and comments.

Structure and Content

The structure of the show is a pioneering format on India's relatively young Metro network culture. Both in terms of content and form, U-Special is unlike previous televised youth forums in India. A segmented packaged aesthetic of capsulated realism in the everyday life of university in Delhi, is intercut with underlaid audio sequencing and a montaged para-narrative that projects a metamorphosed half-hour of televised campus trends.

U-special mirrors peak moments on campuses in the capital while giving its audience an informed young perspective on contemporary affairs, and the average citizen of Delhi an insight into lives of 21st century Indian University goers. Its originality (in the Indian TV scene) lies in breaking bounds of straight jacket in-studio discussion and going beyond the fluff-narrative of a music channel template. While blending these two existing patterns the show represents Universities in a re-mediated hyper-edited template highlighting the contours of "college life", as it involves its audience, across the capital of India, in issues within and outside the Delhi student community.

The U-special show format is a template that continues to be applied to youth talk forums in India, and has been replicated on NDTV's most recent metro network-NDTV HINDU. The shows Chennai avatar retains the original METRONATION Delhi "U-special" title, formatted structure and shooting style.

Episode Coverage 

In the 250 episodes (appx) that originally aired on NDTV METRONATION Delhi between 2007–2010, U-special covered every major Campus in the capital. The show addressed issues ranging from Mumbai 26.11 terror attacks (08), Delhi's serial blasts (08), Youth and climate change (08), The emerging fashion sector (07,08) Centralized reservation in Indian education (08), Panel Discussions with University Deans and College Principals during Delhi University campus admissions (07,08), the Jawahar Lal Nehru University political culture (07,08,09), Homosexuality (illegal in India till 2009), Voting and youth participation in the New Delhi State elections (08), Campus Cultural Festivals and Campus Debates.

Technical Details 

This section lists, in brief, the broadcast frequency, image processing software and transmission equipment used to create the show. U special is a half-hour show with a frequency of airing three times a week. Episodes are shot on a variation of recording equipment including DVCPRO and HDTV cameras, these include either the Sony PD150, Sony DSR-PD170 or Ikegami camera. U-special also went completely digital in 2008 when a majority of its episodes begun to be shot on Panasonic HVX and HPX (P2) chip systems that use solid-state memory and not tape to store HD footage. While the show usually uses two cameras on a given schedule, this number varies depending on the location, size and the number of participants in an episode.

U-special is known to have used up to six cameras in episodes which were dealing with large quantities of audience data and visual imagery. In situations where U-special episodes are shot on multiple cameras, audio from the audience is captured on gun mics while the show host wears a cordless lapel mic which is attached to a Senheiser system radio transmitter with a ME 2 clip-on the microphone which is virtually invisible. The small bodypack transmitter and the camera receiver features nine frequency banks with four directly accessible presets. The post production editing work on U-special is carried out on both Avid and Final Cut Pro software bundles.

Indian television talk shows